James Albert Brailey (1919-1981) was an Australian rugby league footballer who played in the 1940s.

Background
Brailey was born in Marrickville, New South Wales on 10 October 1919.

Playing career

He played seven seasons with Newtown between 1940–1947.

Brailey won a premiership with the club in 1943 and was a member of the team that were runners up in 1944. He was a part of a formidable forward pack which included legendary players including Frank Farrell, Gordon MacLennan, Chicka Cahill and Herb Narvo.

Brailey died on 14 January 1981, aged 61.

References

1919 births
1981 deaths
Newtown Jets players
Australian rugby league players
Rugby league hookers
Rugby league players from Sydney